Will Sherod was an African-American man who was murdered in Braggadocio, Missouri, on May 22, 1927.

References

External links

1927 in Missouri
1927 murders in the United States
People murdered in Missouri
Lynching deaths in Missouri
Racially motivated violence against African Americans
Murdered African-American people
Race-related controversies in the United States